Ashbel is masculine given name, and an occasional surname. Notable people with the name include:

Given name
 Ashbel (biblical figure), a minor biblical figure
 Ashbel A. Dean, American politician
 Ashbel H. Barney, American banker and expressman
 Ashbel P. Fitch, U.S. Representative from New York
 Ashbel Green, American Presbyterian minister and academic
 Ashbel Green (editor) (1928-2013), American editor
 Ashbel Green Gulliver, American legal academic
 Ashbel Green Simonton, North American Presbyterian minister and missionary
 Ashbel Smith, pioneer physician, diplomat and official of the Republic of Texas
 Ashbel P. Willard (1820–1860), the youngest man to be elected governor of the U.S. state of Indiana

Surname
 Dan Ashbel, the Israeli ambassador to Austria and Slovenia

Masculine given names